Ervín Kováč (16 June 1911 – 30 October 1972) was a footballer who played international football for both Czechoslovakia and Slovakia. He played as a defender for Slovan Bratislava.

References

1911 births
1972 deaths
Czechoslovak footballers
Czechoslovakia international footballers
Slovak footballers
Slovakia international footballers
Dual internationalists (football)
ŠK Slovan Bratislava players
Association football defenders